The Bronx Defenders is a public defender office located in the South Bronx neighborhood of New York City. At the Bronx Defenders, criminal defense lawyers work together with civil lawyers, family defense lawyers, immigration lawyers, non-attorney advocates, social workers, and investigators to help their clients address the full range of legal and social issues that can result from criminal charges. The Bronx Defenders are a contracted public defender for New York City, along with the Legal Aid Society, New York County Defender Services in Manhattan, Brooklyn Defender Services in Brooklyn, Queens Law Associates in Queens, and the Neighborhood Defender Service in northern Manhattan.

History 
Founded in 1997 by a team of eight advocates, including its former executive director Robin Steinberg,  David Feige and criminal defense attorney Daniel Arshack, the Bronx Defenders is responsible for developing holistic defense, an interdisciplinary model of criminal defense lawyering. The Bronx Defenders is also host to The Bronx Freedom Fund, the first charitable bail organization in New York State. In recent years, the Bronx Defenders has received national attention and praise for its work providing holistic defense to indigent residents of the Bronx, including the National Legal Aid & Defender Association’s Clara Shortridge Foltz Award.

As of early 2016, the office had 250 employees working in it.

See also 
 The Legal Aid Society
 The Bronx Freedom Fund
 New York City Criminal Court

References

External links 
Official Website

Criminal justice reform in the United States
Criminal defense organizations
Non-profit organizations based in the Bronx
Legal advocacy organizations in the United States
Public defense institutions
Legal aid in the United States
The Bronx Defenders